This is a list of settlements in West Yorkshire by population based on the results of the 2011 census. The next United Kingdom census will take place in 2021. In 2011, there were 50 built-up area subdivisions with 5,000 or more inhabitants in West Yorkshire, shown in the table below.

Administrative boundaries

Population ranking

See also 
 West Yorkshire
 West Yorkshire Urban Area

References 

Geography of West Yorkshire
Metropolitan areas of England
 
West Yorkshire
West Yorkshire